Green Bay, Virginia may refer to the following places in the U.S. state of Virginia:
Green Bay, Hanover County, Virginia
Green Bay, Prince Edward County, Virginia